Lush Life is a studio album released by jazz pianist Dave Burrell. It was first released by Denon Records on April 2, 1978.

The first four songs were also featured on the previous Burrell album Dave Burrell Plays Ellington & Monk. Allmusic comments that the rest of the album, Burrell's own compositions, "are very listenable though none are particularly memorable."

Track listing
"In a Sentimental Mood" (Ellington, Kurtz, Mills) — 5:20
"Lush Life" (Strayhorn) — 6:58
"Come Sunday" (Ellington) — 4:47
"A Flower Is a Lovesome Thing" (Strayhorn) — 2:04
"Mexico City" (Burrell) — 3:05
"Tradewinds" (Burrell) — 7:02
"Crucificade" (Burrell) — 4:54
"Budapest Conclusion" (Burrell) — 3:42

Personnel 
Dave Burrell — piano
Takashi Mizuhashi — bass

References

External links 
 

1978 albums
Denon Records albums
Dave Burrell albums